Donald A. Wilson Secondary School is a high school located in Whitby, Ontario, Canada. Opened in 2004, the school hosts students in grades 9-12 and offers a wide range of academic and extra-curricular activities. The school mascot is an alligator and the school colours are orange, blue, and silver. It is adjacent to All Saints Catholic Secondary School.

Athletics 
Donald A. Wilson Secondary School offers a fairly wide range of sports teams including football, golf, lacrosse, soccer, hockey, baseball, badminton, basketball, skiing, track and field, and cross country.

Notable alumni
Taylor Lord, Canadian soccer player
Greg Morris, Canadian football player
Mitch Wilde, Canadian lacrosse player

See also 
List of high schools in Ontario

References

External links 
Donald A. Wilson Secondary School website

Educational institutions established in 2004
High schools in the Regional Municipality of Durham
Education in Whitby, Ontario
2004 establishments in Ontario